Cleopsylla is a genus name for a group of parasites of the family Stephanocircidae which means "helmet fleas". This genera of parasites can be found in parts of Australia and South America.

Species
C. barquezi López Berrizbeitia, Hastriter, and Díaz, 2016 – described from sigmodontine rodents in northwestern Argentina
C. monticola Smit, 1953
C. townsendi Rothschild, 1914
C. vidua Beaucournu & Gallardo, 1991

Description
The head has a convex area with combs and spines on it. The thorax of these species of Cleopsylla have different rows of setae.

Favorable environmental conditions
These parasites do well in moist and humid environments.

References

Siphonaptera genera